Muriel Fox (born February 3, 1928) is an American public relations executive and feminist activist.

Childhood and education
Muriel Fox's parents were Anne Rubenstein Fox and M. Morris Fox. In 1980, Muriel said (at a Mother's Day rally for the Equal Rights Amendment) that a large inspiration for her feminist activism was her mother's unhappiness at being a housewife. She had a brother, Jerry, who died in 1988 at age 55.

She graduated from Weequahic High School in 1945.

She graduated summa cum laude and Phi Beta Kappa from Barnard College in 1948, having transferred there from Rollins College.

Career
After graduation from college she worked as an advertising copywriter for Sears Roebuck in New York, then as a publicist for Tom Jefferson & Associates in Miami, Florida, where she headed the Dade County re-election campaign of Senator Claude Pepper and helped elect Miami Mayor William M. Wolfarth.

In 1950, she applied for a job at Carl Byoir & Associates, which was then the world's largest public relations agency, but was rejected by the Executive Vice President of the agency, who stated, "We don't hire women writers." In the same year, she was hired as a publicist in Carl Byoir & Associates' Radio-TV Department.  In 1952, she was head of that department, and in 1956 she became the agency's youngest vice president. She was then told she had "progressed as far as she could go because corporate CEOs can't relate to women." It was not until the 1970s that she became Executive Vice President of the agency. She was described in Business Week Magazine'''s list of 100 Top Corporate Women in June 1976 as the "top-ranking woman in public relations." In 1985, she retired from the agency.

She also served as president of Byoir subsidiaries ByMedia (communications training) and ByMart (smaller accounts).

She also served on the board of Rorer Pharmaceuticals from 1979 to 1993, chairing its Nominating Committee, and on the board of directors of Harleysville Mutual Insurance Company from 1976 to 2000, chairing its Audit Committee.

Feminist activism
In 1965–68, she and Senator Maurine Neuberger co-chaired then-vice president Hubert Humphrey's task force on Women's Goals.

In 1966, she co-founded the National Organization for Women (NOW), and she was NOW president Betty Friedan's main lieutenant and director of operations in its earliest years. She also helped edit NOW's original Statement of Purpose (1966). In 1967 she organized NOW's New York chapter, and she founded and edited NOW's first national newsletter (1970-1971). She was the head of public relations for NOW and eventually served as NOW's vice president (1967-1970), chair of its board (1971-1973), and chair of its national advisory committee (1973-1974). In 1975, she organized a successful meeting between NOW officers and Byoir client Sesame Street, which headed off a planned NOW boycott while also resulting in increased participation of female characters on the influential TV show.

In 1970, she was a co-founder of the NOW Legal Defense and Education Fund (NOWLDEF); she served on its board of directors in 1974, and also served as its vice president (1977–1978), president (1978–1981), chair of its board (1981–1992), and honorary chair of its board (1993–present). For NOWLDEF she organized and chaired The National Assembly on the Future of the Family (1979), convening 2,100 civic leaders in the first public forum that highlighted the modern-day transformation of the American family. Also in 1979, she created NOWLDEF's annual Equal Opportunity Awards Dinner, and she co-chaired it for 22 years with co-chairs including prominent corporate American CEOs. She also chaired NOWLDEF's Convocation on New Leadership in the Public Interest (1981), to persuade leaders of business, government, labor, and public policy to be feminist allies.

She was a co-founder in 1974, and the second president in 1976–78, of The Women's Forum of New York, an organization of prominent women whose stated goal was originally to "bring together women of diverse accomplishments and provide them with a forum for the exchange of ideas and experiences. By thus becoming aware of their counterparts in all fields, and of mutual interests and attitudes, they can, when desired, speak in concert on issues confronting the total community."

Beginning in 1993, she chaired the board of Veteran Feminists of America; for them she organized and chaired conferences such as their Salute To Feminist Authors and their Salute To Feminist Artists.  

She was a Senior Editor of the book Feminists Who Changed America (2006).

She raised many millions of dollars for feminist causes.

She lectured throughout the world on feminism and "Moving Women Up the Corporate Ladder," among other topics.Pittsburgh Courier. February 2, 1963. "New Yorker Speaks to Radio-TV Group"Detroit Free Press. Sept. 26, 1974: "Women and Work: No More Stereotypes" In speeches she often urged successful women to abandon their old roles as "Queen Bee" in a man's world. Her most frequent speechline was a call urging successful women to say, "Yes, I am a feminist."

Recognition
In 1985, she was given the Distinguished Alumna Award from Barnard College, and became the first recipient of New York State NOW's Eleanor Roosevelt Leadership Award. In 1991 the Muriel Fox Award for Communications Leadership Toward a Just Society, also called the "Foxy", was created by the NOW Legal Defense and Education Fund; she was its first recipient. In 1996 the Fund granted her an "Our Hero" award "For a Lifetime of Dedication to the Cause of Women’s Equality."Rockland Journal-News. Gannett Suburban Newspapers, New York State.  October 26, 1997. On October 21, 2014 Gloria Steinem presented her with the Lifetime Achievement Award of Veteran Feminists of America in a luncheon at the Harvard Club, New York City, featuring appearances by feminists Eve Ensler, Rosie O'Donnell, Marlo Thomas and Carol Jenkins. Page 1, Pages 15A-16A. "NOW Chapter To Honor Feminist Pioneer"; March 16, 1992. "NOW founder says the feminist struggle is far from over."

She is featured in the feminist history film She's Beautiful When She's Angry (2014).

She was the first public relations executive to be awarded the Achievement Award of American Women in Radio & Television, and the first woman to receive the "Business Leader of the Year" Award from Americans for Democratic Action.

She also was awarded the Caroline Lexow Babcock Award from Rockland County NOW, the Distinguished Citizen Award from the Rockland County Family Shelter, the Matrix Award from New York Women in Communications, the Woman of Accomplishment Award from the Wings Club, and the Woman to Women Award from New York State NOW.

She is listed in Who's Who In America, Who's Who In The World, Foremost Women of the Twentieth Century, Who's Who Of American Women, and Feminists Who Changed America,'' the last of which was edited by Barbara Love.

"Papers of NOW officer Muriel Fox, 1966–1971" is at the Arthur and Elizabeth Schlesinger Library on the History of Women in America, Radcliffe Institute for Advanced Study, Harvard University.

Personal life
She married Dr. Shepard G. Aronson in 1955.  He died November 10, 2003.  They had two children, Eric (born in 1960) and Lisa (born in 1961). Their grandchildren are AnaLua, Marlena, Gabriel, and Ignacio.

References

External links
Muriel Fox interview at makers.com
Papers of NOW officers, 1966-1971. Schlesinger Library, Radcliffe Institute, Harvard University.

1928 births
Living people
American feminists
American women's rights activists
Barnard College alumni
Businesspeople from Newark, New Jersey
Weequahic High School alumni
Rollins College alumni
National Organization for Women people